Zefiro was an Italian and Mediterranean restaurant in Portland, Oregon, United States. The business operated from 1990 to 2000.

Description 
The Italian and Mediterranean restaurant Zefiro was located at the intersection of 21st and Glisan in northwest Portland's Northwest District. The interior had sponge-painted yellow walls and a copper-topped bar. The menu included risotto and a Caesar salad. The dessert menu included gelato affogato and sorbet.

History 
Bruce Carey and Chris Israel opened the restaurant in 1990. Monique Siu and Sarah Wheaton have also been credited for helping the launch. The business closed in 2000.

Reception
In 1991, Zefiro was The Oregonian restaurant of the year. In 2007, Eric Asimov of The New York Times said Zefiro "set a standard for Portland cooking". The restaurant has been described as "ground-breaking", a "Portland landmark", and "a key watershed moment in recent restaurant history in Portland".

In 2017, Nick Zukin of Willamette Week said "Bruce Carey changed Portland dining with Zefiro back in the '90s", and The Oregonian's Douglas Perry wrote, "Zefiro led the way to the enthusiastic, limited-frills foodie reputation that Portland now enjoys around the world."

See also

 List of defunct restaurants of the United States
 List of Italian restaurants

References

1990 establishments in Oregon
2000 disestablishments in Oregon
Defunct Italian restaurants in Portland, Oregon
Defunct Mediterranean restaurants
Mediterranean restaurants in Oregon
Northwest District, Portland, Oregon
Restaurants disestablished in 2000
Restaurants established in 1990